The Sara Bay Classic was a tournament on the Symetra Tour, the LPGA's developmental tour. It was part of the Symetra Tour's schedule between 2012 and 2017. It was held at Sara Bay Country Club in Sarasota, Florida.

Winners

References

Former Symetra Tour events
Golf in Florida